Juana la Loca... de vez en cuando is a 1983 Spanish comedy film directed by José Ramón Larraz, written by Juan José Alonso Millán, scored by Teddy Bautista, and starring Lola Flores, Beatriz Elorrieta, Manolo Gómez Bur. It parodies the life of Joanna of Castile, Queen of Spain.

Cast

References

External links
 

Spanish historical comedy films
1983 comedy films
1983 films
Films directed by José Ramón Larraz
Films shot in Madrid